The thirteenth series of British reality television series The Apprentice (UK) was broadcast in the UK on BBC One, from 4 October to 17 December 2017. Unlike a number of series before which had both their filming and broadcast schedules altered to ensure the programme could aired without clashing with live TV coverage of major sporting and political events, primarily within the UK, it is the first series to focus its broadcast around late Autumn to early Winter, rather than in Spring as had been done when the programme first premiered. Alongside the standard twelve episodes, the series was preceded by the mini online episode "Meet the Candidates" on 26 September, with two specials aired alongside the series – "The Final Five" on 8 December, and "Why I Fired Them" on 14 December.

Eighteen candidates took part in the thirteenth series, with James White and Sarah Lynn becoming the overall winners, marking it as the first time in the programme's history that a series ended with joint winners. Excluding the specials, the series averaged around 6.94 million viewers during its broadcast.

Series Overview 
Applications for the thirteenth series began in late November 2016, towards the end of the twelfth series, with applicants assessed and interviewed by production staff between January and February 2017. Filming took place during Spring to early Summer that year, once the final line-up of eighteen participants had been finalised, with final editing completed before the programme's premiere episode was broadcast in mid-Autumn. Unlike previous series in which the filming schedules had to be rearranged so that the programme's broadcast did not clash with live coverage of major sporting and political events, it was decided that The Apprentice maintain its Autumn broadcast for the foreseeable future, out of convenience seen from the successive rescheduling in past consecutive years after the ninth series. Filming of the first task saw the men name their team Vitality, while the women named their team Graphene.

Of those who took part, both James White and Sarah Lynn would become the eventual winners, an event that marks the first time in the programme's history that Alan Sugar invested in two business partners in the finals as well as choosing joint winners for a series. The aftermath of this result received mixed feedback from viewers and fans of the show. While James would go on to use his investment to start up his IT recruitment firm Right Time Recruitment, Sarah would go on to use her investment to start up an online personalised sweets gift service Sweets in the City.

Candidates

Performance chart 

Key:
 The candidate won this series of The Apprentice.
 The candidate won as project manager on his/her team, for this task.
 The candidate lost as project manager on his/her team, for this task.
 The candidate was on the winning team for this task / they passed the Interviews stage.
 The candidate was on the losing team for this task.
 The candidate was brought to the final boardroom for this task.
 The candidate was fired in this task.
 The candidate lost as project manager for this task and was fired.

Episodes

Ratings 
Official episode viewing figures are from BARB.

References

External links 
 Official site BBC

13
2017 British television seasons